Undullah is a rural locality split between the City of Logan and the Scenic Rim Region, Queensland, Australia.

Geography
Undullah is dominated by the Flinders Peak Group which rises towards its western boundary. Within the locality are the following mountains (from north to south):
  Mount Elliott 
  Mount Wilbraham 
  Rocky Knob 
 Mount Flintoff 
 Mount Joyce 

Woollaman Creek, a tributary of Teviot Brook, is the major waterway in the suburb.

Very little of the area is developed with most of the rangelands covered by bush.

History
The Undullah is believed to be the word nandulla from the Bundjalung and/or Yuggera languages meaning the silver leafed iron bark (eucalyptus melanophloia).

Henry Herbert Elliott was an early settler who raised cattle.

Formerly in the Shire of Beaudesert, Undullah was split between Logan City and Scenic Rim Region following the local government amalgamations in March 2008.

On 20 May 2016, the eastern part of Undullah (within Logan City) was excised to create the new localities of Flinders Lakes and Monarch Glen and part of the new locality of Flagstone.

Education 
There are no schools in Undullah. The nearest government primary schools are Ripley Valley State School in South Ripley to the north, Flagstone State School in Flagstone to the east, and Peak Crossing State School in Peak Crossing to the west. The nearest government secondary schools are Ripley Valley State Secondary College in South Ripley, Flagstone State Community College in Flagstone, and Bremer State High School in Ipswich to the north-west.

References

Suburbs of Logan City
Scenic Rim Region
Localities in Queensland